Jinusean (Hangul: 지누션; stylized as JINUSEAN) was a South Korean hip hop duo signed to YG Entertainment. The duo, which is made up of Kim Jin-woo (also known as Jinu) and Noh Seung-hwan (also known as Sean), debuted in 1997 and rose to fame with the single, "Tell Me." They are considered pioneers of Korean hip hop.

History
Prior to forming Jinusean, Sean worked as a back-up dancer for legendary K-pop group Seo Taiji and Boys in the early 1990s, and Jinu debuted as a solo artist with the song, "I Was The Captain" in 1994. The two debuted as Jinusean with the single, "Gasoline," in 1997 under the guidance of YG Entertainment CEO and former Seo Taiji and Boys member Yang Hyun-suk and former Deux member Lee Hyun Do. Their second single, "Tell Me" (featuring singer Uhm Jung-hwa), was the duo's first hit and propelled them to stardom. Notably, Jinusean became the first hip hop artist to sell over 700,000 copies in South Korea.

Between 2004 and 2014, the duo went on an extended hiatus but remained at YG Entertainment working in various behind-the-scenes roles. They also individually made guest appearances at several YG Family concerts. In 2014 they made an appearance in the Infinite Challenge special "Saturday, Saturday is for Singers" (ToToGa), which features popular singers and groups from the 1990s, and performed as a duo on television for the first time in a decade. In 2015 they released their comeback single "Tell Me One More Time", their first release since 2004. They also appeared in the fourth season of the rap competition Show Me the Money as judges.

Members 
 Jinu
 Sean

Discography

Studio albums

Singles

Videography

Music videos

Filmography

Television shows

Concerts

Awards and nominations

References

External links 

 Jinusean Website 

YG Entertainment artists
Musical groups established in 1997
Musical groups disestablished in 2004
Musical groups reestablished in 2015
Musical groups disestablished in 2020
Hip hop duos
South Korean musical duos